K. W. Michael Siu is a Canadian chemist, currently a distinguished research professor at York University. He is a Fellow of the Royal Society of Canada and Chemical Institute of Canada.

References

Year of birth missing (living people)
Living people
Academic staff of York University
Canadian chemists